John Francis Oscar Arpin (3 December 1936 – 8 November 2007) was a Canadian composer, recording artist and entertainer, best known for his work as a virtuoso ragtime pianist.

Born in Port McNicoll, Ontario Arpin studied piano at The Royal Conservatory of Music, earning his ARCT diploma in 1953. He also studied at the Faculty of Music, University of Toronto.

Arpin performed and toured widely. He died 8 November 2007 in Toronto, Ontario.

Recording career
Arpin recorded more than sixty albums, mostly of ragtime, but also played Broadway music, pop music, and classical music.

In 2002, he recorded seven CDs of piano solo music on the April Avenue record label. These albums consisted of favorite Broadway themes and familiar pop tunes. While just two compilations are still available in CD format, most of the other tracks can still be found on iTunes. Here is a complete list:

A Nightingale Sang in Berkeley Square
All The Way
An Affair To Remember
Any Dream Will Do
As Time Goes By
Bewitched
Blue Moon
Brian's Song
Cabaret
Call Me Irresponsible
Cheek To Cheek
Climb Every Mountain
Dear Heart
Don't Cry For Me Argentina
Edelweiss
Fly Me to the Moon
Georgia on My Mind
Getting To Know You
Have You Met Miss Jones?
Hello Young Lovers
Here
I Didn't Know What Time It Was
I Left My Heart in San Francisco
I Only Have Eyes For You
I Will Wait For You
If I Loved You
Isn't It Romantic?
It Had To Be You
It Might As Well Be Spring
It's Impossible
I've Got You Under My Skin
Jean
Killing Me Softly
La Mer
Little Girl Blue
Love Is A Many-Splendored Thing
Mame
Manhattan
Memory
Misty
Moon River
More
Mountain Greenery
My Funny Valentine
My Romance
My Way
Nadia's Theme
Oh What a Beautiful Morning
On The Street Where You Live
Once Upon A Time
Over The Rainbow
People
People Will Say We're in Love
Put on a Happy Face
Que Sera
Raindrops Keep Falling on My Head
Sera
Smile
Smoke Gets in Your Eyes
Some Enchanted Evening
Spanish Eyes
Spring Is Here
Star Dust
Stranger on the Shore
Tammy
The Blue Room
The Days of Wine And Roses
The Entertainer
The Look of Love
The Music of the Night
The Shadow of Your Smile
The Sound of Music
The Surrey with the Fringe on Top
The Way We Were
Theme From "Nicholas And Alexandra"
There And Everywhere
There's A Small Hotel
Till There Was You
Tomorrow
Unchained Melody
Unforgettable
We Kiss in a Shadow
What I Did For Love
What Kind of Fool Am I?
When I Fall in Love
Where Or When
Who Can I Turn To?
With A Song in My Heart
Yesterday
You Took Advantage of Me

Performances
Arpin performed as a solo entertainer and with orchestras throughout the world. In Canada, he performed with Maureen Forrester and Peter Appleyard. He made several appearances at the Mariposa Folk Festival, the St. Louis Ragtime Festival, and the Scott Joplin Festival in Sedalia, Missouri. In the Toronto area, he performed regularly in bars, clubs, and hotel lounges, notably The King Edward Hotel, The Ports of Call, The Windsor Arms, Mr. Tony's, and Pearcy House.

Awards
Arpin was nominated three times for Juno Awards, given to show excellence in Canadian music. In June 1998, he won the Scott Joplin Award from the Scott Joplin Foundation of Sedalia, Missouri.

Critical acclaim
Ragtime great Eubie Blake pronounced John Arpin "the Chopin of Ragtime", while The New York Times labeled him "the Richter of Ragtime". 
High Fidelity magazine said of one of his albums: "This is the best recorded collection of piano rags that I know of and is, I suspect, the most authentically performed."

Compositions
Notable among his own compositions are "Jogging Along" (a theme song for the acclaimed CBC radio program Morningside). He also composed the theme for TVOntario's children's shows, Polka Dot Door and Polka Dot Shorts and wrote the music for the shows. Arpin also composed the themes for several CTV network shows in the 1960s. His "Lyric Suite for Piano, Strings and Percussion" won first prize out of 450 entrants in the Yamaha Second International Original Concert in Tokyo. He also arranged music for several Canadian recording acts.

In 2005, he was commissioned by St. Michael's Choir School (Toronto) to compose and arrange a "medley" of Christmas tunes which he titled "Yuletide on the Cool Side". It was very warmly received in its premiere on a concert tour across Canada.

References

Further reading

External links

Encyclopedia of Music in Canada entry
Arpin's personal web site
JohnAndMaryJane.blogspot Blog maintained by Arpin's wife

1936 births
2007 deaths
People from Simcoe County
University of Toronto alumni
The Royal Conservatory of Music alumni
Canadian male composers
Canadian pop musicians
Canadian classical pianists
Male classical pianists
Musicians from Toronto
20th-century Canadian composers
20th-century Canadian male musicians